Fife Lake is a village in southeastern Grand Traverse County in the U.S. state of Michigan. Its population was 456 at the 2020 census, up from 443 at the 2010 census. The village is part of the Traverse City micropolitan area, and lies upon the shore of the lake of the same name.

History 
In 1872, J.L. Shaw and others platted two small settlements on a lake on the new Grand Rapids and Indiana Railroad. These were known as North Fife Lake and Fyfe Lake (a misspelling of Fife), which were on the north and west sides of Fife Lake, respectively. Later that year, Fife Lake Township was created. The first church in the village was established in 1884. In 1889, Fife Lake was incorporated as a village.

The village annually hosts the Fife Lake Ice Fishing Derby near the end of January.

Geography
The village is located in Fife Lake Township, and is adjacent to the eponymous lake. The village also shares a border with Kalkaska County, to its east.

Fife Lake is the only community in Grand Traverse County to be located east of US 131.

Demographics

2010 census 
As of the census of 2010, there were 443 people, 189 households, and 110 families residing in the village. The racial makeup of the village was 95.7% White, 0.7% African American, 1.6% Native American, and 2.0% from two or more races. Hispanic or Latino of any race were 1.8% of the population.

There were 189 households, of which 27.5% had children under the age of 18 living with them, 40.2% were married couples living together, 11.6% had a female householder with no husband present, 6.3% had a male householder with no wife present, and 41.8% were non-families. 30.7% of all households were made up of individuals, and 12.1% had someone living alone who was 65 years of age or older. The average household size was 2.34 and the average family size was 2.89.

The median age in the village was 41.1 years. 22.8% of residents were under the age of 18; 6.7% were between the ages of 18 and 24; 25.4% were from 25 to 44; 29.3% were from 45 to 64; and 15.6% were 65 years of age or older. The gender makeup of the village was 49.0% male and 51.0% female.

2000 census 
As of the census of 2000, there were 466 people, 185 households, and 120 families residing in the village. The racial makeup of the village was 90.77% White, 0.64% African American, 3.22% Native American, and 5.36% from two or more races. Hispanic or Latino of any race were 0.21% of the population.

There were 185 households, out of which 35.7% had children under the age of 18 living with them, 51.4% were married couples living together, 9.7% had a female householder with no husband present, and 34.6% were non-families. 28.1% of all households were made up of individuals, and 11.4% had someone living alone who was 65 years of age or older.  The average household size was 2.52 and the average family size was 3.07.

In the village, the population was spread out, with 28.8% under the age of 18, 7.9% from 18 to 24, 30.5% from 25 to 44, 23.4% from 45 to 64, and 9.4% who were 65 years of age or older.  The median age was 35 years. For every 100 females, there were 98.3 males.  For every 100 females age 18 and over, there were 96.4 males.

The median income for a household in the village was $32,361, and the median income for a family was $42,188. Males had a median income of $32,083 versus $24,375 for females. The per capita income for the village was $19,024.  About 9.4% of families and 13.8% of the population were below the poverty line, including 18.0% of those under age 18 and none of those age 65 or over.

Climate
This climatic region has large seasonal temperature differences, with warm to hot (and often humid) summers and cold (sometimes severely cold) winters.  According to the Köppen Climate Classification system, Fife Lake has a humid continental climate, abbreviated "Dfb" on climate maps.

Transportation

Air travel 
The nearest airport with commercial service is Cherry Capital Airport in Traverse City. Smaller landing strips are nearby, though, such as Kalkaska City Airport in Kalkaska.

Major highways 
  runs northeast–southwest just west of the village business district, providing access to Indiana, Grand Rapids, Cadillac, Kalkaska, and Petoskey
  runs west from the town towards M-113, providing access to Kingsley and the Traverse City area.

Railroads 
Fife Lake used to be a station on the Grand Rapids and Indiana Railroad. Today, it is served by the Great Lakes Central Railroad. However, Fife Lake is no longer a station.

Education 
Fife Lake is served by the Forest Area Community Schools District. The district includes Fife Lake Elementary School and Forest Area Middle/High School, located in neighboring Springfield Township.

Notable people 
Jerry Cannon - retired Brigadier General, U.S. Army

References

External links
Fife Lake Michigan Information
Fife Lake Chamber of Commerce

Villages in Grand Traverse County, Michigan
Villages in Michigan
Traverse City micropolitan area
1872 establishments in Michigan
Populated places established in 1872